Snezhana Kerkova (married Dzhalova; born 30 January 1938) is a Bulgarian sprinter. She competed in the women's 100 metres at the 1960 Summer Olympics.

References

External links
 

1938 births
Living people
Athletes (track and field) at the 1960 Summer Olympics
Athletes (track and field) at the 1964 Summer Olympics
Bulgarian female sprinters
Bulgarian female hurdlers
Olympic athletes of Bulgaria
Universiade medalists in athletics (track and field)
Place of birth missing (living people)
Universiade silver medalists for Bulgaria
Medalists at the 1959 Summer Universiade
Medalists at the 1961 Summer Universiade
Medalists at the 1965 Summer Universiade
21st-century Bulgarian women
20th-century Bulgarian women